Ian Morris Synman (born 28 September 1938) is a former Australian rules footballer who played in the Victorian Football League (VFL).

He played as a centre half-back for the St Kilda Football Club, playing 153 games (0 goals) from 1958 to 1969. A Melbourne Grammar recruit, he played 123 consecutive games and wore the number 9.

Synman played in the 1966 premiership side. He is Jewish and, although the Grand Final fell on Yom Kippur, Synman received special dispensation to play. He is one of the few Jewish players to have played Australian rules football at the highest level.

See also
List of select Jewish Australian Rules footballers

Notes

References
 My Mark!, The Age, (Wednesday, 24 March 1965), p.24.

External links
Bio at Saints.com.au
1966 Grand Final page at Australian Football

Living people
St Kilda Football Club players
St Kilda Football Club Premiership players
Australian Jews
1938 births
Australian rules footballers from Victoria (Australia)
People educated at Melbourne Grammar School
One-time VFL/AFL Premiership players